The Golden Fleecing is a 1940 American comedy film directed by Leslie Fenton and written by S. J. Perelman, Laura Perelman and Marion Parsonnet. The film stars Lew Ayres, Rita Johnson, Lloyd Nolan, Virginia Grey, Leon Errol and Nat Pendleton. The film was released on August 16, 1940, by Metro-Goldwyn-Mayer.

Plot
Mary Blake insists that mild-mannered insurance salesman Henry Twinkle demand a raise if they intend to get married. Henry earns praise and a raise from his boss when he sells a valuable policy to a man named Gus Fender.

Fender turns out to be a gangster with a huge reward for anyone who brings him in, dead or alive. Henry's furious boss orders him to personally assure Fender does not end up dead. Fender and his moll, Lila Hanley, however, dupe Henry into a scheme in which they will end up with the reward money themselves. Henry foolishly tries to pay them with a check.

Mary, who quit her job after Henry's raise, bemoans his acceptance of a worthless stock and even sues him to get back money she feels she's got coming. The stock ends up valuable after all and Henry ends up with $150,000 in hand. He naively gives Fender a fistful of cash, which then accidentally gets burned into ashes.

Cast 

 Lew Ayres as Henry Twinkle
 Rita Johnson as Mary Blake
 Lloyd Nolan as Gus Fender
 Virginia Grey as Lila Hanley
 Leon Errol as Uncle Waldo Burke
 Nat Pendleton as 'Fatso' Werner
 George Lessey as Buckley Sloan
 Richard Carle as Pattington
 Ralph Byrd as Larry Kelly
 Marc Lawrence as 'Happy' Dugan
 Thurston Hall as Charles Engel
 James Burke as Sibley
 Spencer Charters as Justice of Peace
 William Demarest as Swallow
 Ray Walker as Reporter

References

External links 
 
 
 
 

1940 films
American comedy films
1940 comedy films
Metro-Goldwyn-Mayer films
Films directed by Leslie Fenton
American black-and-white films
1940s English-language films
1940s American films